Sam McElroy (born c. 1963) is an American football coach. He served as head football coach at Tarleton State University from 2005 to 2009, compiling a record of 40–15.

McElroy is a 1985 graduate of Southwest Texas State University (now Texas State University), where he did not play varsity football but served as student assistant to head coach John O'Hara. Soon after graduation he became assistant coach at Corsicana High School. In 1989, he was hired by Grant Teaff to serve as graduate assistant at Baylor University. He later had short stints at Navarro College and at Alto High School, where he was named 1992 District 22-AA Coach of the Year after winning the district title and earning a state playoff berth.

In 1993, McElroy was hired by Ron Randleman to serve as defensive backs coach at Sam Houston State University. During his seven years on the staff at Sam Houston State, McElroy coached eight players who earned All-Southland Conference honors. In 2000, he left SHSU to join Todd Whitten's coaching staff at Tarleton State as defensive coordinator. While at Tarleton, McElroy guided a defense that improved each year under his direction. His last season with the Texans, his defense allowed opponents just 271 yards of offense and 17.1 points per game to rank second in the Lone Star Conference.

After the 2002 season, McElroy left Tarleton State to join Darrell Dickey's coaching staff at the University of North Texas. In 2005, McElroy returned to Tarleton State, succeeding Todd Whitten as Texans head coach.

On February 3, 2010, McElroy was hired by Texas Tech head coach Tommy Tubberville to coach the defensive line. On December 9, 2011, he was fired from this position.

Head coaching record

College

References

Year of birth missing (living people)
Date of birth missing (living people)
Living people
Baylor Bears football coaches
Navarro Bulldogs football coaches
North Texas Mean Green football coaches
Sam Houston Bearkats football coaches
Tarleton State Texans football coaches
Texas State Bobcats football coaches
Texas Tech Red Raiders football coaches
High school football coaches in Texas
Texas State University alumni
People from Corsicana, Texas
Sportspeople from Texas